Dalvin Tomlinson (born February 28, 1994) is an American football nose tackle for the Cleveland Browns of the National Football League (NFL). He played college football at Alabama. He was drafted by the New York Giants in the second round of the 2017 NFL Draft, and played for the team from 2017 to 2020.

High school career
Tomlinson attended Henry County High School in McDonough, Georgia. He played football and was a wrestler in high school, winning three state titles.

College career

Redshirt freshman
Tomlinson began attending Alabama in 2012 and redshirted his first season while still recovering from a torn ACL he suffered playing for his soccer team in high school.

Freshman
Throughout Alabama's fall camp in 2013, Tomlinson competed with Ed Stinson, Jeoffrey Pagan, and A'Shawn Robinson for the starting defensive end position. Head coach Nick Saban named him the backup right defensive end behind Jeoffrey Pagan to begin his freshman season. On August 31, 2013, Tomlinson made his collegiate debut during Alabama's 35-10 victory over Virginia Tech. He recorded four combined tackles, but left after suffering a knee injury that caused him to miss the entire 2013 season. He had a surgery to repair the knee injury and was due to miss 5–6 months.

Sophomore
He returned to fall camp in 2014 and competed with Jonathan Allen and D. J. Pettway for the job as the starting defensive end. On August 30, 2014, Tomlinson recorded five combined tackles during Alabama's season-opening 33-23 victory over West Virginia. On October 25, 2014, he recorded two solo tackles and sacked Tennessee's quarterback Joshua Dobbs for the first one of his career during a 34-20 victory. On November 15, 2014, he recorded a season-high seven combined tackles, two tackles Mississippi, and made the second sack of his career, as Alabama defeated Mississippi State. He finished his sophomore season in 2014 with 22 combined tackles (8 solo), two sacks, and 5.5 tackles for a loss in 14 games.

Junior
Tomlinson returned to fall camp in 2015, competing for the starting defensive end position with A'Shawn Robinson, Jarran Reed, Jonathan Allen, and Da'Shawn Hand. He was named the backup right defensive end behind Jarran Reed to begin his third season. In Alabama's season-opener against Wisconsin, Tomlinson made two solo tackles and a career-high three pass deflections during Alabama's 35-17 victory. On September 26, 2015,  Tomlinson recorded a season-high five combined tackles in a 35-0 defeat over Louisiana-Monroe. During a Week 8 contest against LSU, he collected four combined tackles and was credited for half a sack on Brandon Harris in a 30-16 victory. Tomlinson completed the 2015 season with 34 combined tackles (22 solo), a half a sack, and led the Crimson Tide with five pass deflections in 14 games. He was a part of a highly touted defensive front in 2015, that consisted of four future NFL players that would all be taken in the first two rounds of the 2016 and 2017 NFL Draft. Along with him and nose tackle Daron Payne, the defensive line included A'Shawn Robinson (46th overall, 2016), Jarran Reed (49th overall, 2016), and Jonathan Allen (17th overall, 2017).

Senior
Tomlinson competed with Jonathan Allen, Dakota Ball, and Da'Shawn Hand for the vacant defensive end positions throughout fall camp. Head coach Nick Saban named him the right defensive end opposite Jonathan Allen, to begin the 2016 season. He made his first career start during Alabama's season-opener against USC and helped hold the Trojans to 64 rushing yards and recorded one tackle during the 52-6 victory. He played both defensive tackle and defensive end throughout the game. The following week against Western Kentucky, he recorded three combined tackles, a tackle for a loss, and his first sack of the season, as the Crimson Tide defeated the Hilltoppers 38-10. On November 19, 2016, Tomlinson collected a career-high eight combined tackle and was credited with an assist for a tackle for a loss during a 31-3 win against Chattanooga. He finished his senior season a total of 62 combined tackles (45 solo), 5.5 tackles for a loss, three sacks, and a forced fumble in 14 games and 14 starts.

During his career he had 122 tackles and four sacks.

Professional career
Tomlinson received an invitation to the Senior Bowl and helped the South defeat the North 16-15 with four combined tackles. The Cleveland Browns, Houston Texans, Philadelphia Eagles, and San Diego Chargers all met and interviewed Tomlinson during the week of the Senior Bowl. He attended the NFL Combine and performed all of the combine and positional drills except for the bench. He also participated at Alabama's Pro Day and opted to only run positional drills and perform the bench press for scouts and team representatives. The majority of NFL draft experts and analysts projected him to be selected anywhere from the second to fourth round. He was ranked the fifth best defensive tackle in the draft by NFLDraftScout.com and NFL media analyst Mike Mayock, ranked the sixth best defensive tackle by ESPN, and was ranked the ninth best defensive tackle by Sports Illustrated.

New York Giants
The New York Giants selected Tomlinson in the second round with the 55th overall pick in the 2017 NFL Draft.

On May 10, 2017, the New York Giants signed Tomlinson to a four-year, $4.57 Million contract that includes $2.13 million guaranteed and a signing bonus of $1.46 million.

He competed with Robert Thomas, Jay Bromley, Jarron Jones, Jordan Williams , and Corbin Bryant throughout training camp for the role as the starting defensive tackle. Head coach Ben McAdoo named Tomlinson the right defensive tackle, along with Damon Harrison, to begin the regular season.

He made his professional regular season debut during the Giants' season-opener against the Dallas Cowboys and made four combined tackles in the Giant's 3-19 loss.

He originally began the 2018 season at defensive end. After Damon Harrison was traded to the Detroit Lions, Tomlinson was named starting nose tackle.

Minnesota Vikings
On March 17, 2021, Tomlinson signed a two-year, $22 million contract with the Minnesota Vikings.

Cleveland Browns
On March 15, 2023, Tomlinson signed a four-year, $57 million contract with the Cleveland Browns.

References

External links
 
Minnesota Vikings bio
Alabama Crimson Tide bio

1994 births
Living people
People from McDonough, Georgia
Players of American football from Georgia (U.S. state)
American football defensive tackles
American football defensive ends
Alabama Crimson Tide football players
New York Giants players
Minnesota Vikings players
Cleveland Browns players
Ed Block Courage Award recipients